Zoomerang may refer to:

 Zoomerang (Alabama Adventure), a defunct roller coaster at Alabama Adventure
 Zoomerang (Lake Compounce), a roller coaster at Lake Compounce, Connecticut
 Zoomerang (survey tool), an online survey tool owned by SurveyMonkey
 Zoomerang Tour, a 1993 Australian concert tour by U2